Mashu is a mythological mountain.

Mashu or Mashū may also refer to:

 Mashu, Iran, a village
 Mashu (band), Canterbury scene improvisational group from 1995 to 1998
 Lake Mashū, Hokkaidō, Japan
 Mashū Station, train station Hokkaidō, Japan
 Mashu Baker (born 1994), Japanese judoka
 An alternate Romanization of Masyu, a Nikoli puzzle